The 1933 All-Southern Conference football team consists of American football players chosen by the Associated Press (AP) and United Press (UP) for the All-Southern Conference football team for the 1933 college football season.

All-Southern Conference selections

Quarterbacks
 Horace Hendrickson, Duke (AP-1)

Halfbacks
 Earl Clary, South Carolina (AP-1)
 Alfred Casey, Virginia Tech (AP-1)

Fullbacks
 Bob Cox, Duke (AP-1)

Ends
 Tom Rogers, Duke (AP-1)
 Warren Hengri, Virginia Tech (AP-1)

Tackles
 Fred Crawford, Duke (AP-1)
 Ray Burger, Virginia (AP-1)

Guards
 Amos Bolen, Washington & Lee (AP-1)
 George T. Barclay, North Carolina (AP-1)

Centers
 Eugene Wager, Virginia (AP-1)

Key
AP = Associated Press

UP = United Press

See also
1933 College Football All-America Team

References

All-Southern Conference football team
All-Southern Conference football teams